Robert 'Bobby' Adamson is a former Scottish footballer who played for Greenock Morton, Raith Rovers, St Mirren and Arbroath.

References

Scottish Football League players
Greenock Morton F.C. players
Dundee F.C. players
Raith Rovers F.C. players
St Mirren F.C. players
Arbroath F.C. players
Year of birth unknown
Living people
Association football outside forwards
Scottish footballers
Year of birth missing (living people)